Allen Booi (1943 – 20 July 2020) was a South African actor. He was best known for his roles in the series Tsha Tsha and After Nine.

Career
In 1988, Booi made his film debut with Mercenary Fighters directed by Riki Shelach. He also appeared in the films Diamond in the Rough and Act of Piracy. The following year in 1989, Booi made his television debut in Inkom' Edla Yodwa and appeared in the films In the Name of Blood and The Evil Below. He went on to play Gagashe in the series Ubambo Lwami.

In 2003, Booi joined the cast of the SABC 1 drama series Tsha Tsha as the character Mike, a role he played until 2006. In the meantime, he made supporting and guest appearances in series such as Zero Tolerance, Zone 14 and After 9. Then in 2007, he starred as Godfrey Xaba in the SABC1 miniseries After Nine. 

Booi had guest roles in the television series Generations, A Place Called Home, Muvhango, Isidingo and The Queen. His other notable television roles came through Mfo Kamkhize, Mongezi, Sdididi, Odessa, Phindi, 14th Floor, Getting it Right, Timber, Inxhaki Ka Sam, Ubambo Lwami, Khululeka, Going Up, Soul City, Backstage, and Mponeng. In July 2020, before his death, he was supposed to go to Cape Town to start shooting for a role.

Personal life
Booi was a Catholic. In 2019, he became ill due to a mild heart attack. He died on 20 July 2020 at the age of 77 in Johannesburg at his residence. He was survived by his wife, Cathy and two children.

Filmography

Film

Television

References

External links
 

1943 births
2020 deaths
South African Roman Catholics
South African male film actors
South African male stage actors
South African male television actors